The 1994–95 CIS Insurance  Rugby Union County Championship was the 95th edition of England's County Championship rugby union club competition. 

Warwickshire won their 10th title after defeating Northumberland in the final.

Final

See also
 English rugby union system
 Rugby union in England

References

Rugby Union County Championship
County Championship (rugby union) seasons